The 2007–2008 FIG Rhythmic Gymnastics World Cup series was a series of stages where events in rhythmic gymnastics were contested. The series consisted of a two-year long competition, culminating at a final event — the World Cup Final in 2008. A number of qualifier stages were held. The top 3 gymnasts and groups in each apparatus at the qualifier events would receive medals and prize money. The organizing committees were free to host all-around competitions, but these were not eligible for the assignment of World Cup points. Gymnasts and groups that finished in the top 8 also received points which were added up to a ranking that qualified for the biennial World Cup Final.

Stages

Medalists

Individual

All-around

Rope

Hoop

Clubs

Ribbon

Group

All-around

5 ropes

3 hoops and 4 clubs

References

2007
2007 in gymnastics
2008 in gymnastics